Slizké is a village and municipality in the Rimavská Sobota District of the Banská Bystrica Region of southern Slovakia.

First named in 1285 - "Zyluche", as part of the Balog lands. In 1301- "Styluche", then in 1413 - "Slyche", 1427 - "Scylische, Sciliche".

External links
 
http://www.statistics.sk/mosmis/eng/run.html

Villages and municipalities in Rimavská Sobota District